The Campeonato Paranaense Série Bronze is the third tier of football league of the state of Paraná, Brazil.

List of champions

Notes

Serrano is the currently Prudentópolis.
Metropolitano is the currently Maringá FC.

Titles by team 

Teams in bold still active.

By city

References

 
Paranaense